Red Rhino Records, also known as Red Rhino, was a British independent record label which was developed by the independent record shop and wholesaler of the same name, all formed and run by "Tony K" (Tony Kostrzewa) and his wife Gerri. It was part of the Cartel, a co-operative record distribution organisation in the United Kingdom, set up by a number of small independent record labels to handle their distribution to record shops.

History 
Set up at the end of the 1970s, it maintained its base in York (with a shop, originally in Gillygate and later in Goodramgate) and through the early 1980s, with the growth of independently produced music, expanded its business to a point where the wholesale side became the separate entity, Red Rhino Distribution Limited. It also developed, in parallel with the main record label, a small music publishing company called Screaming Red Music and the subsidiary labels Ediesta and Red Rhino Europe (RRE), the latter notable for releases by Front 242 and Butthole Surfers. The label was closed down with the financial collapse of Red Rhino Distribution in 1988, while its subsidiary label Red Rhino Europe continued under the name RRE Records (or simply RRE) as a subsidiary of Play It Again Sam. The most notable artists featured in the main label's catalogue were The Mekons, Skeletal Family, :zoviet*France: and the first record releases by Pulp.

Notable releases

Discography

References

External links
Discogs.com, a community-built database of music information
Red Army Choir

Defunct record labels of the United Kingdom